The Atlanta Vultures were a professional indoor football team and a member of American Indoor Football (AIF) that played part of the 2016 season.  Based in Atlanta, Georgia, the Vultures were to play their home games at the Georgia International Convention Center.

The Vultures are Atlanta's second AIF team, following the Atlanta Sharks who began play in 2014 and folded during the 2015 season.

The Vultures ran into operational issues when they found their home arena lacked quality playing turf. The Vultures would end up cancelling all home games and played three road games during the season, winning two of the three games. However, after winning the third game against the Savannah Steam on April 17, the AIF ruled that the Vultures had played the game using illegal players and reversed the score of the game (essentially making it a forfeit). The Vultures folded and took down their website later that week.

Roster

Staff

Statistics and records

Season results

Head coaches' records

2016 season

Key:

Exhibition
All start times were local to home team

Regular season
All start times were local to home team

Standings

References

External links
Atlanta Vultures official website
American Indoor Football official website

American football teams in Atlanta
American football teams in Georgia (U.S. state)
Former American Indoor Football teams
Defunct indoor American football teams
American football teams established in 2015
American football teams disestablished in 2016
2015 establishments in Georgia (U.S. state)
2016 disestablishments in Georgia (U.S. state)